John P. Lawrence Plantation is a historic tobacco plantation house and national historic district located near Grissom, Granville County, North Carolina.  The house was built about 1845, and is a two-story, three bay, "T"-plan, heavy timber frame Greek Revival style dwelling.  It has a low hipped roof, brick-walled basement, and one-story front porch with a hipped roof.  Also on the property are the contributing smokehouse, kitchen, schoolhouse, corn crib, and gambrel roofed stable.

It was listed on the National Register of Historic Places in 1988.

References

Tobacco plantations in the United States
Plantation houses in North Carolina
Houses on the National Register of Historic Places in North Carolina
Historic districts on the National Register of Historic Places in North Carolina
Greek Revival houses in North Carolina
Houses completed in 1845
Houses in Granville County, North Carolina
National Register of Historic Places in Granville County, North Carolina